Zaizen (written: 財前) is a Japanese surname. Notable people with the surname include:

, Japanese footballer
, Japanese footballer
, Japanese actress
, Japanese footballer

See also
Ioan Zaizan (born 1983), Romanian runner

Japanese-language surnames